Officially State Russian Drama Theatre named after Konstantin Stanislavski, more commonly Stanislavski Russian Theatre, is a state theatre in the Armenian capital of Yerevan located on Abovyan Street in the central Kentron district of the city, next to Charles Aznavour Square. It was opened in 1937 and named after the Russian actor and theatre director Constantin Stanislavski since 1938. The theatre director is Alexander Grigoryan since 1965.

The shows of the theatre are mainly from the Russian works of art and literature with some shows of Armenian classical writers. There are also afternoon shows for children at the weekends.

The Stanislavski theatre is constructed on the place of a demolished Russian church.

External links
About russian drama theater in Yerevan

Theatres in Armenia
Armenian culture
Buildings and structures in Yerevan
1937 establishments in Armenia